Matthew Talbot Baines  (17 February 1799 – 22 January 1860) was a British lawyer and Liberal politician. He most notably served as Chancellor of the Duchy of Lancaster in Lord Palmerston's 1855 to 1858 administration.

Background and education
Born at Leeds, Yorkshire, Baines was the eldest son of Edward Baines, a noted journalist and minor politician, by Charlotte, daughter of Matthew Talbot. Sir Edward Baines was his younger brother. He was educated at Richmond School and Trinity College, Cambridge, where he graduated in 1820.

Legal and political career
Baines was called to the bar in 1825 and established a successful legal practice. In 1837 Baines was appointed Recorder of Kingston upon Hull, and in 1841 he became a Queen's Counsel. Baines then turned to politics and was elected to parliament for Kingston upon Hull in 1847, a seat he held until 1852, and subsequently represented Leeds until 1859. Only two years after entering the House of Commons, he was appointed President of the Poor Law Board in the Whig administration of Lord John Russell. In July 1849 he was also admitted to the Privy Council. The Liberals fell from power in February 1852, but in December of the same year he was once again appointed President of the Poor Law Board, this time in the coalition government headed by Lord Aberdeen.

Baines remained as head of the Poor Law Board when Lord Palmerston's became Prime Minister in February 1855. In December 1855 he was made Chancellor of the Duchy of Lancaster with a seat in the cabinet. He remained in this office until the Liberals lost power in 1858. Baines was also a Deputy Lieutenant of the West Riding of Yorkshire and of Lancashire. He retired from public life in April 1859 on grounds of ill-health.

Personal life
In 1833, Baines married the only daughter of Lazarus Threlfall. He died in January 1860, at the age of 60.

References

External links 
 

1799 births
1860 deaths
Alumni of Trinity College, Cambridge
Chancellors of the Duchy of Lancaster
Deputy Lieutenants of Lancashire
Deputy Lieutenants of the West Riding of Yorkshire
Liberal Party (UK) MPs for English constituencies
Members of the Privy Council of the United Kingdom
UK MPs 1847–1852
UK MPs 1852–1857
UK MPs 1857–1859
Politicians from Kingston upon Hull